Nothocestrum is a genus of flowering plants in the nightshade family, Solanaceae. It contains four species of large shrubs or small trees that are endemic to Hawaii, where they are known as aiea.

Species
 Nothocestrum breviflorum A.Gray – Smallflower aiea (island of Hawaii)
 Nothocestrum latifolium A.Gray – Broadleaf aiea (Maui, Molokai,  Lānai, Oahu, Kauai)
 Nothocestrum longifolium A.Gray – Longleaf aiea (island of Hawaii, Maui, Molokai, Lānai, Oahu, Kauai)
 Nothocestrum peltatum Skottsb. – Oahu aiea (Kauai)

Medicinal use
The leaves, bark, and tap root of Nothocestrum spp. were used to make infusions applied topically to treat abscesses, the plant parts being pounded, mixed with water, strained, heated with hot rocks, and cooled before application. The same plant parts were also made into a liquid medicine taken internally to treat abscesses. This medicine also contained ‘ohi‘a bark (Metrosideros spp.), moa holo kula (Psilotum nudum) and kō honua‘ula (red/purple sugarcane, Saccharum officinarum).

References

External links

Physaleae
Endemic flora of Hawaii
Trees of Hawaii
Solanaceae genera
Taxonomy articles created by Polbot